The list of kings of the Picts is based on the Pictish Chronicle king lists. These are late documents and do not record the dates when the kings reigned. The various surviving lists disagree in places as to the names of kings, and the lengths of their reigns. A large portion of the lists, not reproduced here, belongs with the Caledonian or Irish mythology. The latter parts of the lists can largely be reconciled with other sources.

Pictish kings
Pictish kings ruled in northern and eastern Scotland. In 843 tradition records the replacement of the Pictish kingdom by the Kingdom of Alba, although the Irish annals continue to use Picts and Fortriu for half a century after 843. The king lists are thought to have been compiled in the early 8th century, probably by 724, placing them in the reigns of the sons of Der-Ilei, Bridei and Nechtan.

Irish annals (the Annals of Ulster, Annals of Innisfallen) refer to some kings as king of Fortriu or king of Alba. The kings listed are thought to represent overkings of the Picts, at least from the time of Bridei son of Maelchon onwards. In addition to these overkings, many less powerful subject kings existed, of whom only a very few are known from the historical record.

Mythical kings of the Picts are listed in the Lebor Bretnachs account of the origins of the Cruithne. The list begins with Cruithne son of Cing, who is reported to be "father of the Picts". The account of the Pictish Chronicle then splits into four lists of names:
 The first is a list of the sons of Cruithne.
 The second is a list of early kings with no distinguishing information other than dates.
 The third is another list of early kings with neither stories nor dates, all of whom have two names that begin with "Brude". It is possible that "Brude" is an ancient title for "king" from another source, which was misinterpreted as a name by the compiler (cf. Skene p.cv).
 The fourth is a list of later kings. The first of these to be attested in an independent source is Galam Cennalath.

The dates given here are drawn from early sources, unless specifically noted otherwise. The relationships between kings are less than certain and rely on modern readings of the sources.

Names
Orthography is problematic. Cinioch, Ciniod and Cináed all represent ancestors of the modern Anglicised name Kenneth. Pictish "uu", sometimes printed as "w", corresponds with Gaelic "f", so that Uuredach is the Gaelic Feredach and Uurguist the Gaelic Fergus, or perhaps Forgus. As the Dupplin Cross inscription shows, the idea that Irish sources Gaelicised Pictish names may not be entirely accurate.

Kings of the Picts
Colouring indicates groups of kings presumed to be related.

Early kings

Early historical kings
The first king who appears in multiple early sources is Bridei son of Maelchon, and kings from the later 6th century onwards may be considered historical as their deaths are generally reported in Irish sources.

Later historical kings

Kings of the Picts 839–848 (not successively)
The deaths of Eógan and Bran appear to have led to a large number of competitors for the throne of Pictland.

Kings of the Picts traditionally counted as King of Scots
Cináed mac Ailpín (Kenneth MacAlpin in English) defeated the rival kings, winning out by around 845–848. He is traditionally considered the first "King of Scots", or of "Picts and Scots", allegedly having conquered the Picts as a Gael, which is turning history back to front. As most modern scholars point out, he was actually 'King of Picts', and the terms 'King of Alba' and the even later 'King of Scots' were not used until several generations after him.

King of Alba

See also
Siol Alpin
 Origins of the Kingdom of Alba
 List of Kings of Dál Riata
 List of Kings of Strathclyde

Further reading
James E. Fraser, The New Edinburgh History of Scotland Vol. 1 – From Caledonia to Pictland, Edinburgh University Press (2009) 
Alex Woolf, The New Edinburgh History of Scotland Vol. 2 – From Pictland to Alba, Edinburgh University Press, (2007) 

Notes

References
For primary sources, see External links below

 Adomnán, Life of St Columba, tr. & ed. Richard Sharpe. Penguin, London, 1995. 
 Anderson, Alan Orr, Early Sources of Scottish History A.D. 500–1286, vol. 1. Reprinted with corrections. Paul Watkins, Stamford, 1990. 
 Bannerman, John, Studies in the History of Dalriada. Scottish Academic Press, Edinburgh, 1974. 
 Bannerman, John. "The Scottish Takeover of Pictland and the relics of Columba" in Dauvit Broun and Thomas Owen Clancy (eds.) Spes Scotorum: Saint Columba, Iona and Scotland. Edinburgh: T. & T. Clark, 1999 
 Broun, Dauvit, "Dunkeld and the origin of Scottish identity" in Broun & Clancy (1999).
 Broun, Dauvit, "Pictish Kings 761–839: Integration with Dál Riata or Separate Development" in Sally M. Foster (ed.), The St Andrews Sarcophagus: A Pictish masterpiece and its international connections. Four Courts, Dublin, 1998. 
 Clancy, Thomas Owen, "Caustantín son of Fergus (Uurgust)" in M. Lynch (ed.) The Oxford Companion to Scottish History. Oxford & New York: Oxford UP, 2002. 
 Herbert, Máire, "Ri Éirenn, Ri Alban: kingship and identity in the ninth and tenth centuries" in Simon Taylor (ed.), Kings, clerics and chronicles in Scotland 500–1297. Four Courts, Dublin, 2000. 
 Skene, William F. Chronicles of the Picts, Chronicles of the Scots, and other Early Memorials of Scottish History. Edinburgh: H.M. General Register House, 1867.
 Smyth, Alfred P. Warlords and Holy Men: Scotland AD 80-1000. Reprinted, Edinburgh: Edinburgh UP, 1998. 
 Woolf, Alex, "Pictish matriliny reconsidered" in The Innes Review, Volume XLIV, Number 2 (Autumn 1998). ISSN 0020-157X
 Woolf, Alex, "Ungus (Onuist), son of Uurgust" in M. Lynch (2002).

External links
 Norway book : "Jomsvikingslaget i oppklarende lys", informs the Pictish kings escaped to the coast of Norway, instead of being murdered at Scone
CELT: Corpus of Electronic Texts at University College Cork
The Corpus of Electronic Texts''' includes the Annals of Ulster, Tigernach, the Four Masters and Innisfallen, the Chronicon Scotorum, the Lebor Bretnach (which includes the Duan Albanach''), Genealogies, and various Saints' Lives. Most are translated into English, or translations are in progress
Annals of Clonmacnoise at Cornell
Linguistic analysis of legendary kings

Picts, Kings of
Pictish monarchs
Medieval documents of Scotland
Medieval Scottish literature
Lists of office-holders in Scotland